Anthony Hawles DD (1609 – 16 January 1664) was a Canon of Windsor from 1660 to 1664 and Archdeacon of Salisbury.

Career

He was born in Winterborne Monkton, Dorset and educated at Queen's College, Oxford where he graduated BA in 1627, MA in 1630 and DD in 1660.

He was appointed:
Chaplain to King Charles II in his exile
Archdeacon of Salisbury 1658 – 1664
Prebendary of Bitton in Salisbury 1660 – 1664
Rector of Great Knoyle, Wilshire 1660
Rector and Vicar of Bishopston, Wiltshire 1662

He was appointed to the eighth stall in St George's Chapel, Windsor Castle in 1660 and held the canonry until 1664.

Notes 

1609 births
1664 deaths
Canons of Windsor
Alumni of The Queen's College, Oxford
Archdeacons of Salisbury
17th-century English Anglican priests
People from Dorset